North Roscommon was a UK Parliament constituency in Ireland, returning one Member of Parliament from 1885 to 1922.

Prior to the 1885 general election the area was part of the Roscommon constituency. From 1922 it was no longer represented in the UK Parliament.

Boundaries
This constituency comprised the northern part of County Roscommon.

1885–1922: The baronies of Ballintober North, Boyle and Frenchpark, and that part of the barony of Roscommon not contained in the constituency of South Roscommon.

Members of Parliament

Elections

Elections in the 1880s

Elections in the 1890s

Elections in the 1900s

Elections in the 1910s

O'Kelly dies, prompting a by-election.

References

Historic constituencies in County Roscommon
Westminster constituencies in County Roscommon (historic)
Dáil constituencies in the Republic of Ireland (historic)
Constituencies of the Parliament of the United Kingdom established in 1885
Constituencies of the Parliament of the United Kingdom disestablished in 1922